Youssouf Dao (born 5 March 1998) is an Ivorian footballer who last played as a forward for Sparta Prague B.

International career 
International with the under 23, he helped Ivory Coast qualify for the 2020 olympics in the U23 CAN, and he figured in the team of the tournament.

References

External links 
 

Living people
1998 births
Ivorian footballers
Association football forwards
Footballers at the 2020 Summer Olympics
Olympic footballers of Ivory Coast
ASEC Mimosas players
AC Sparta Prague players
FC Sellier & Bellot Vlašim players
Ivorian expatriate footballers
Ivorian expatriate sportspeople in the Czech Republic
Expatriate footballers in the Czech Republic
Czech National Football League players